UniEnergy Technologies (UET) was a U.S. vanadium redox flow battery manufacturer in Mukilteo, Washington, which manufactured megawatt-scale energy storage systems for utility, commercial and industrial customers.  The company was founded in 2012 by Dr. Gary Yang and Dr. Liyu Li to commercialize a new Vanadium electrolyte formulation the pair had developed while working at Pacific Northwest National Laboratory.  The new formulation, a mixed-acid solution, was patented by PNNL and the patent was licensed to UET for commercialization.  The mixed-acid vanadium electrolyte allows for a wider temperature range for operations, and double the energy density of the traditional vanadium electrolyte.  
 
The company had designed a megawatt-scale flow battery using this new electrolyte for the purpose of allowing rapid deployment, manufacturing repeatability and lower costs.    The company also employed an R&D team which worked to make advances on the electrolyte chemistry and stack design.

UET had a subsidiary in Germany, Vanadis Power which provides sales and services for Europe. The company had partnerships with Bolong New Materials, a vanadium electrolyte manufacturer, and Rongke Power, the Chinese vanadium flow battery stack manufacturer. In December 2015 the company completed their B round funding series which included a major investment from Orix Corp. In October 2021, UniEnergy filed for involuntary Chapter 11 bankruptcy, listing no assets or debts.

Products
UniEnergy sold a 10kW, 34kWh fully integrated flow battery called the ReFlex.  This product was sized to be a building block for commercial and utility scale deployments from kilowatts to multi-megawatt installations.

References

External links
 UniEnergy Technologies Homepage
UniEnergy Technologies News

Battery manufacturers
Grid energy storage
Companies based in Mukilteo, Washington
Manufacturing companies based in Washington (state)